Stanley Gordon Ogden (1 November 1910 – 13 December 1974) was an Australian rules footballer who played with Richmond and Hawthorn in the Victorian Football League (VFL).

Notes

External links 

1910 births
1974 deaths
Australian rules footballers from Victoria (Australia)
Richmond Football Club players
Hawthorn Football Club players